2nd Krasnikovo or Vtoroye Krasnikovo is a rural locality in Besedinsky Selsoviet Rural Settlement, Kursky District, Kursk Oblast, Russia. Population:

Geography 
The village is located in the Rat River basin (a right tributary of the Seym), 106 km from the Russia–Ukraine border, 13 km east of the district center – the town Kursk, 2 km from the selsoviet center – Besedino.

 Climate
2nd Krasnikovo has a warm-summer humid continental climate (Dfb in the Köppen climate classification).

Transport 
2nd Krasnikovo is located 1.5 km from the federal route  (Kursk – Voronezh –  "Kaspy" Highway; a part of the European route ), 1 km from the road of intermunicipal significance  (R-298 – Shekhovtsovo), 7 km from the nearest railway station Otreshkovo (railway line Kursk – 146 km).

The rural locality is situated 13 km from Kursk Vostochny Airport, 120 km from Belgorod International Airport and 191 km from Voronezh Peter the Great Airport.

References

Notes

Sources

Rural localities in Kursky District, Kursk Oblast